Gabriella Louise Ortega Lopez (born December 2, 1998), known professionally as Gabbi Garcia, is a Filipino actress, global endorser, singer, host and vlogger. Currently an artist of the GMA Network, her first acting role was as Nicole Perez on GMA Network's primetime series My Destiny, Pia Sta. Maria in Let The Love Begin. She then played Alena in the reboot of Encantadia which gave her massive popularity and rose to fame.

Career
Garcia began working in commercials and joining singing competitions. In 2013, she made her television acting debut as one of the young lead stars in GMA Network's primetime series My Destiny. For a few years, she was credited as Gabrielle Garcia.

She was paired with Ruru Madrid in a loveteam. The pair went on to topbill the teledrama Let the Love Begin, the political sitcom Naku, Boss Ko!, and the 2016 remake of the phenomenal fantasy series, Encantadia, in which Garcia portrayed her breakout role, Sang'gre Alena, originally portrayed by Karylle. This raised her and her co-stars' status as a celebrity. The loveteam starred in another television drama, Sherlock Jr., however, Garcia's protagonist character suddenly died in the middle of the teleseries. This marked as the end of Garcia and Madrid's onscreen loveteam in 2018. 

At the same year, Garcia starred in her first television drama outside the former loveteam through Pamilya Roces with Gloria Diaz and Carla Abellana. In 2019, she starred in the revenge drama series Beautiful Justice with Bea Binene and Yasmien Kurdi.

Garcia has since stated that she prefers a variety of leading men as opposed to a single long-term "love team." In the promotions for LSS (Last Song Syndrome), a movie in which her leading man is played by her real-life boyfriend Khalil Ramos, she and Ramos have refused to call themselves a love team.

Filmography

Television

Digital

Film

Music video appearances

Discography

Albums

Singles

Awards and nominations

References

External links
 
 Sparkle profile
 

1998 births
Living people
Filipino television personalities
Filipino television actresses
Filipino child actresses
Filipino film actresses
Filipino female models
GMA Network personalities
GMA Integrated News and Public Affairs people
People from Makati
Actresses from Metro Manila
Filipino television variety show hosts